The Galway and Salthill Tramway Company operated a  narrow gauge passenger tramway service in Galway between 1879 and 1918.

History

The tramway linked the city of Galway and the seaside resort of Salthill. The route ran from the depot on Forster Street, Galway near to Galway railway station south west to a terminus on the seafront at Salthill. The cost of construction was £13,000.

The initial six tramcars were double-deck cars by the Starbuck Car and Wagon Company, requiring two horses each. The tramway relied heavily on the tourist trade, which was drawn by the possibility of excursions to the Aran Islands by the Galway Bay Steamboat Company.

Closure

The reliance on the tourist trade resulted in a slump in the company's fortune during the First World War and many of the company horses were commandeered by the British Army in 1917 for the war effort. The company was wound up during 1918.

References

Tram transport in Ireland before partition
3 ft gauge railways in Ireland
Galway and Salthill Tramway